Cyclophora difficilis is a moth in the  family Geometridae. It is found in the Amazon rainforest.

References

Moths described in 1920
Cyclophora (moth)
Moths of South America